Clube Recreativo Leões de Porto Salvo  is a sports club based in the village of Porto Salvo, Portugal. The futsal team of Leões de Porto Salvo plays in the Portuguese Futsal First Division.

Futsal

Current squad

References

External links
 Official website
 Zerozero

Futsal clubs in Portugal